How It Is is a novel by Samuel Beckett first published in French as Comment c'est by Les Editions de Minuit in 1961. The Grove Press (New York) published Beckett's English translation in 1964. An advance text of his English translation of the third part appeared in the 1962 issue of the Australian literary journal, Arna.

L'Image, an early variant version of Comment c'est, was published in the British arts review, X: A Quarterly Review (1959), and is the first appearance of the novel in any form.

The novel is a monologue by the narrator as he crawls through endless mud, recalling his life separated into three distinct periods.

Synopsis 
The title is Beckett's literal translation of the French phrase, comment c'est (how it is), a pun on the French verb commencer or 'to begin'.

The text is divided into three parts:

"before Pim" - the solitary narrator journeys in the mud-dark until he encounters another creature like himself thereby forming a "couple". His journey is abundant with recollections from his life above, including reminiscences of a woman and of his parents.

"with Pim" - the narrator is motionless in the mud-dark until he is abandoned by Pim.

"after Pim" - the narrator returns to his earlier solitude but without motion in the mud-dark. He postulates that there must be several others like him and Pim. As the attempted explanation however requires a constant accumulation of ad hoc hypotheses, he acknowledges the wish for a simpler explanation. Only the mud and the obscurity remain certainties.

In a letter (April 6, 1960) to Donald McWhinnie of the BBC Radio Drama Company, Beckett explained his strange text as the product of a  " 'man' lying panting in the mud and dark murmuring his 'life' as he hears it obscurely uttered by a voice inside him... The noise of his panting fills his ears and it is only when this abates that he can catch and murmur forth a fragment of what is being stated within...  It is in the third part that occurs the so-called voice 'quaqua', its interiorisation and murmuring forth when the panting stops. That is to say the 'I' is from the outset in the third part and the first and second, though stated as heard in the present, already over."

Theme 
The theme may be the struggle of form to emerge from formlessness using Leopardi's sense of the world as mud (E fango è il mondo) and therefore, a kind of purgatory, as well as Dante's image of souls gulping mud in the Stygian marsh of the Inferno (Canto VII, 109–126, in Palma's translation):

Set in the slime, they say: 'We were sullen, with
no pleasure in the sweet, sun-gladdened air,
carrying in our souls the fumes of sloth.
Now we are sullen in this black ooze' – where
they hymn this in their throats with a gurgling sound
because they cannot form the words down there.

Dante's Belacqua and his foetal position also are referenced in How It Is and the following quotation is an example of the work's unpunctuated, dense, and poetic style:

the knees drawn up the back bent in a hoop the tiny head near the knees curled round the sack Belacqua fallen over on his side
tired of waiting forgotten of the hearts where grace abides asleep

Influence 
Jean-Luc Godard's 1962 short film "La Paresse" begins and ends with shots of Eddie Constantine and Nicole Mirel reading Beckett's work as well as of the text itself.

The novel served as inspiration for Miroslaw Balka's 2009 work, How It Is, in Tate Modern's Turbine Hall.

The character of the 'Angsal', the mysterious angel in Jerry Hunter's mud-soaked novel Ebargofiant (Y Lolfa, 2014) is an intertextual reference.

The song "How It Is" released on Lemon Sauce by Liad Eini in 2022, has been confirmed by the musician that the novel was a main influence aside from the title.

References

 

1964 novels
Novels by Samuel Beckett